The Werni language, Warnang, is a Niger–Congo language of the Heiban family spoken in Kordofan, Sudan.

References

Heiban languages